Rolling Hills Country Day School is a nonsectarian independent Kindergarten to Grade 8 school located in Rolling Hills Estates on the Palos Verdes Peninsula in Los Angeles County, California.

History 
Rolling Hills Country Day School was founded in 1961. It is accredited by the Western Association of Schools and Colleges.

Student population 
The school has 395 students from approximately nine local communities (for 2017–2018), Lower School (Kindergarten through Grade 5): 231 students, Middle School (Grades 6 through 8): 150 students.
70 percent Caucasian, 21 percent Asian, 4 percent Middle Eastern, 2 percent Hispanic, 3 percent African American.

Faculty 
Kindergarten through Grade 8 Faculty: 38, Number of faculty with advanced degrees: 45 percent, Student-to-Faculty ratio: Average of 12:1

Intracurriculars 
The school's co-curricular programs offer programs in the following areas: 
 Outdoor Education
 The Arts 
Athletics
 Community Service
 After School Programs

Outdoor education 
All Country Day School students in Grades 4 through 8 participate in outdoor education. Students are challenged in many ways with the common goal of developing self-reliance and team-building skills. Country Day School graduates remark that their outdoor education experience was one of their most memorable.

The outdoor education experiences include:
Grade 4: Lazy W San Juan Capistrano; gold mining
Grade 5: Astro Camp, San Bernardino, CA; physical science camp
Grade 6: Joshua Tree; camping, hiking. 
Grade 7: Catalina Island Marine Institute, CA; diving/snorkeling along with island ecology to study marine habitat.
Grade 8: Olympic Park Institute in Washington state. Students learn about the rainforest and Native American culture.

The arts 

Singing, painting, and drawing are incorporated into students’ studies beginning in Kindergarten. Students in the third grade perform The Nutcracker adapted into a musical. For the fourth grade mission project students paint and fire Spanish tiles depicting their particular California mission. Fourth grade students continue their studies of California history by performing a play called Oh California! and fifth grade students perform a play called Fifty Nifty while studying United States history.

Facilities include: Music Room, Art studio, Multi-Purpose Room for live performances

Athletics 

In addition to a full-time physical education program with four dedicated teachers, Rolling Hills Country Day School also offers after school sports for middle school students.  All students are invited to participate in volleyball, basketball, soccer, swimming, and water polo in an organized league.

Community service 
Community Service is an important part of Country Day School.  There are a variety of activities in which students become involved throughout the year, whether as part of their classroom experience or out in the community. The school has holiday giving programs that collect food and gifts for families at a nearby disadvantaged school for both Thanksgiving and Christmas. The school also holds an annual food drive to supplement local food banks. In the past, students have also collected coats and shoes and delivered them to local schools and overseas. The student council regularly holds bake sales to raise money for worldwide disasters.  In addition, its students visit local assisted living facilities.

After school programs 
Country Day School offers options for after school care for students. It has several programs, including Homework club, freestyle aquatics and after care, from dismissal to 6 pm.

Athletics

Physical education 
Throughout the school year students take part in a variety of selected activities, including yoga and swim.

After school athletics 
The RHCDS competitive sports program provides Middle School students with an opportunity to participate in the following sports: Co-Ed Water Polo, Co-Ed Swim Team, Boys and Girls Soccer, Boys and Girls Basketball, Boys and Girls Volleyball. The school is part of the  South Bay Athletic League.

Campus 
The campus is located in Rolling Hills Estates, CA.  All grades have enough iPads for the whole class available for each child to use.  Facilities include six school buildings, two science labs, library, junior olympic size swimming pool, one full and two half basketball courts, one volleyball court, playground, synthetic turf sports field, music room, art studio, multi-purpose room for live performances, and  iMac computer lab.

Accreditations 
Western Association of Schools and Colleges (WASC)

Affiliations 
Western Association of Schools and Colleges (WASC), Educational Records Bureau (ERB), California Kindergarten Association

References

External links
 Rolling Hills Country Day School

1961 establishments in California
Educational institutions established in 1961
Private elementary schools in California
Private middle schools in California
Schools in Los Angeles County, California